"Enamorada de Ti" is a song recorded by American Tejano recording artist Selena for her second studio album, Ven Conmigo (1990). The song was written by Selena y Los Dinos band member Pete Astudillo and her brother, A.B. Quintanilla III, and produced by Quintanilla, and is a Spanish-language adaptation of "Is It the Beat?", an English song originally written by Quintanilla III and Pamela Phillips Oland and recorded by Selena in 1989 for a potential English-language crossover album. "Enamorada de Ti" is a freestyle song, a musical genre popular during the late 1980s. The recording was remixed by Juan Magan for the eponymous album in 2012, a project headed by Humberto Gatica. Although the song was moderately successful during the early 1990s, it was exposed to a wider audience in the remix album Enamorada de Ti. Because of this, the song peaked at number 17 on the US Billboard Regional Mexican Digital Songs chart that year. In 1997, the posthumously-released remix version of "Is It the Beat?" adopted the rap verse found in "Enamorada de Ti".

In the Spanish lyrics, the protagonist proclaims to her love interest how she cannot function normally in his absence, because she is in love with him; while the English lyrics deal with falling in love at first sight at a nightclub. Selena performed "Enamorada de Ti" during her Ven Conmigo Tour (1990–92) and at the 1990 Tejano Music Awards, where she received the Female Vocalist of the Year award; she also performed "Is It The Beat?" at least once as part of a medley with the Spanish version during the Ven Conmigo Tour. During the first season of Telemundo's La Voz Kids, a Spanish-language version of the US singing competition The Voice, Xairexis Garcia performed "Enamorada de Ti".

Background and development 

In 1989, Selena was signed to EMI Latin and released her self-titled debut album that year. Around that time her brother, A.B. Quintanilla III, began producing and writing most of her songs. Selena had earlier recorded three demo songs for a potential English crossover album, one of these songs being "Is It The Beat?", written by Quintanilla III and Pamela Phillips Oland, but was told that she was not ready for an English debut. The demo for "Is It The Beat?" later was released to fans in 2016 after being found on a cassette.

According to Quintanilla III in the 20 Years of Music series, his father (and band manager) Abraham Quintanilla, Jr. originated the idea of recording a "hip-hop"-type song for Selena's second studio album, Ven Conmigo. He said that Quintanilla Jr was told by Jose Behar, president of EMI Latin, that several pop-music executive producers were going to attend an upcoming performance by Selena and her band. The idea was that Quintanilla III could write a song which could attract a crossover deal from EMI Records. Upon listening to the original recording of "Is It the Beat?", the decision was made to write and record a Spanish-language adaptation of the song, called "Enamorada de Ti", for Ven Conmigo. During the interview, Quintanilla III said that the writing for "Enamorada de Ti" began in an Albuquerque, New Mexico Motel 6 with fellow band members Pete Astudillo and keyboardist Ricky Vela. In the same interview Selena's sister (and drummer) Suzette Quintanilla called the recording a "Top 40 song" and "fun, that was definitely one of the fun songs on the album", with the recording "bringing out Selena's soul side". 

The recording is a freestyle dance-pop song in common time at a tempo of 112 beats per minute. In the Spanish lyrics, the singer is saddened and bewildered by the departure of her love interest. She tells him how much she is in love with him, and cannot live without him. The English lyrics, meanwhile, speak of the singer falling in love at first sight with a mysterious man while dancing at a nightclub. The remix version featured on Enamorada de Ti (2012) is a merengue duet with Spanish singer Juan Magan.

At the 1990 Tejano Music Awards Selena performed "Enamorada de Ti" with three backup dancers, emulating dance moves popularized by Michael and Janet Jackson. She won the Tejano Music Award for Female Vocalist of The Year. During the first season of Telemundo's La Voz Kids, a Spanish-language version of the US singing competition show The Voice, Xairexis Garcia performed "Enamorada de Ti".

Critical reception and legacy 
Federico Martinez of La Prensa called "Enamorada de Ti" a "popular title track". In his review of the remix album Stephen Thomas Erlewine of AllMusic wrote that all its songs were "rooted in the '90s and sound that way", and altering the recordings to "update it" was unfeasible. Carlos Quintana, a Latin-music writer for About.com, called "Enamorada de Ti" one of the best tracks on the remix album. Enrique Lopetegui of the San Antonio Current called it a "crowd-pleasing" song with an "unbearable" merengue. Nilan Lovelace of Reporter Magazine Archives noted that although the original recording of "Enamorada de Ti" was a "slow tempo love song", the remix version had a "lively, tropical tone".

"Enamorada de Ti" has been featured on several compilation albums since its debut on Ven Conmigo in 1990. A club-mix version of the song was featured on All My Hits/Todos Mis Exitos Vol. 2 (2000), and the original version was added to La Leyenda (2010). "Is It the Beat?" was released posthumously on the soundtrack for Selena's biographical film and as a single on contemporary hit radio on June 17, 1997; the soundtrack version included a rap verse taken directly from "Enamorada de Ti". The single also included two versions of "Enamorada de Ti": a Spanish radio edit and a Spanish club mix, as well as a Spanglish version which combined verses from both songs. In 2012, Humberto Gatica headed the production of Enamorada de Ti with the goal of rejuvenating several of Selena's songs in popular genres. Spanish singer Juan Magan remixed and sang a small part in "Enamorada de Ti" for the album. The recording peaked at number 17 on the US Billboard Regional Mexican Digital Songs chart that same year.

Chart performance

Personnel 
Credits from the album's liner notes:
Selena – vocals
Ricky Vela  – keyboards
Suzette Quintanilla – drums
A.B. Quintanilla III – writer/producer
Pete Astudillo - writer
Juan Magan - remixed/producer/arranger (remix version)

References 

1990 songs
Dance-pop songs
Freestyle music songs
Electronic songs
Juan Magan songs
Selena songs
Songs written by A. B. Quintanilla
Spanish-language songs
Songs written by Pete Astudillo
Song recordings produced by A. B. Quintanilla
Merengue songs